The following is a list of the symbols of the U.S. state of Arkansas.

State symbols

The following state symbols are officially recognized by state law.
State anthem: "Arkansas" by Eva Ware Barnett, adopted: 1987
State historical song: "The Arkansas Traveler" by Sandford C. Faulkner, adopted: 1987
State motto: Regnat Populus ("The People Rule"), adopted: 1907
State songs: "Arkansas (You Run Deep In Me)" by Wayland Holyfield and "Oh, Arkansas" by Terry Rose and Gary Klass, adopted: 1987

Other

Extra info
The designation of a variety of tomato as both the state fruit and the state vegetable is correct.  Standing on both sides of the long-running controversy, the law recognizes that the tomato is botanically a fruit, but is a vegetable in culinary use; thus it is officially both in Arkansas.

Though two other songs are designated as "state songs" (plus a "state historical song" which was the state song from 1949 to 1963), by state law the Secretary of State must respond to any requests for "the state song" with the music of the state anthem, "Arkansas"; it was the state song before 1949 and from 1963 to 1987, when it became state anthem and the other songs gained their present status.  This is strictly to preserve the status of "Arkansas"; all four songs are either copyrighted by the state itself or in the public domain.

See also
List of Arkansas-related topics
Lists of United States state insignia
State of Arkansas

References

External links
State Symbols of Arkansas

State symbols
Arkansas